Monardis is a genus of sawflies belonging to the family Tenthredinidae.

Species:
 Monardis plana

References

Tenthredinidae
Sawfly genera